Rudolf Drößler (born 18 May 1934 in Zeitz) is a German specialized book author and science-journalist.

Rudolf Drößler spent his childhood in the German city Zeitz, where he made his general qualification for university entrance in 1952. He studied Germanistics as well as Astronomy in Leipzig till 1956. After that he was teacher at the "Geschwister-Scholl"-school in Zeitz for several years.

Besides his job-related activities, he pursued archaeological and historical studies. During his complementary activities as memorial curator, he acquired a large amount of knowledge for his later activities and works.

After his first successful books, he became known as a freelance science journalist and specialized book author for  astronomy, archeology and cultural history since 1975.
In doing so he dealt critically with astrology and other pseudoscience.

Also he wrote some theater plays and other works of regional importance. In 1988 Rudolf Drößler published a biographical novel about the great Swiss archaeologist Otto Hauser, who was involved in the conflict between Germany and France in the time of World War I.

In addition he administers the  "Wissenschaftliche Privatsammlung 'Otto Hauser'" together with Manuela Freyberg.

From 1991 till 1997, Rudolf Drößler was the town clerk for his home town, Zeitz.

Works 

 Wir beobachten den Himmel, 1963
 Die Venus der Eiszeit, 1967 ISBN B0000BQR9H
 Als die Sterne Götter waren, 1976 
 Kunst der Eiszeit von Spanien bis Sibirien, 1980
 Brücken in die Vergangenheit, 1980 
 Planeten, Tierkreiszeichen, Horoskope, 1984 
 Kulturen aus der Vogelschau, 1987 
 Flucht aus dem Paradies, 1988 
 Astronomie in Stein, 1990 
 Handlesen, Kartenschlagen, Pendeln (together with Manuela Freyberg), 1990 
 Menschwerdung, 1993 
 2000 Jahre Weltuntergang, 1999

Honors 

 "Verdienstmedaille des Verdienstordens der Bundesrepublik Deutschland" for merits for town- and regional research 2002

External links
 

1934 births
Living people
People from Zeitz
People from the Province of Saxony
German male writers
Writers from Saxony-Anhalt
Leipzig University alumni
Recipients of the Medal of the Order of Merit of the Federal Republic of Germany